James H. Jackson (born April 24, 1939) is a former science teacher, coach, businessman, and state legislator from Iowa. He was a Democrat. He was born in Waterloo, Iowa and graduated from East High School. He graduated from the State College of Iowa in Cedar Falls, Iowa. He married Janet L. Norman in 1958 and they had three daughters. He was hired by Pepsi.

References

Democratic Party members of the Iowa House of Representatives
20th-century American politicians
20th-century American businesspeople
20th-century American educators
1939 births
Living people